The eastern Mindanao gymnure (Podogymnura intermedia) is a species of gymnure in the genus Podogymnura. It is known only from Mount Hamiguitan and Mount Kampalili, two mountains in the eastern part of the island of Mindanao in the Philippines. It was first named in 2023 by a team of researchers led by Danilo Balete.

It is intermediate in size between the larger Dinagat gymnure (Podogymnura aureospinula) and the smaller Mindanao gymnure (P. truei) and P. minima, whence the name intermedia. There are some differences between the populations from Mt. Hamiguitan and Mt. Kampalili; for instance, the Kampalili gymnures have softer fur.

References

Podogymnura
Mammals of the Philippines
Endemic fauna of the Philippines
Fauna of Mindanao
Mammals described in 2023